The Best of Squirrel Nut Zippers as Chronicled by Shorty Brown is a 2002 "best of" compilation album by the swing revival band Squirrel Nut Zippers.

Track listing

Videos
"Hell" [Multimedia Track]
"Put a Lid on It" (LA El Rey Version) [Multimedia Track]
"Put a Lid on It" (NC Version) [Multimedia Track]

Squirrel Nut Zippers albums
1995 greatest hits albums